The 1986 Oklahoma State Cowboys baseball team represented the Oklahoma State University in the 1986 NCAA Division I baseball season. The Cowboys played their home games at Allie P. Reynolds Stadium. The team was coached by Gary Ward in his 9th year at Oklahoma State.

The Cowboys won the Midwest Regional to advance to the College World Series, where they were defeated by the Florida State Seminoles.

Roster

Schedule

! style="" | Regular Season
|- valign="top" 

|- bgcolor="#ccffcc"
| 1 || February 28 || at  || Cameron Field • Houston, Texas || 6–2 || 1–0 || –
|-

|- bgcolor="#ffcccc"
| 2 || March 1 || at Rice || Cameron Field • Houston, Texas || 0–4 || 1–1 || –
|- bgcolor="#ffcccc"
| 3 || March 2 || vs Rice || Cameron Field • Houston, Texas || 4–5 || 1–2 || –
|- bgcolor="#ccffcc"
| 4 || March 5 || at  || Rebel Field • Paradise, Nevada || 18–12 || 2–2 || –
|- bgcolor="#ffcccc"
| 5 || March 6 || at UNLV || Rebel Field • Paradise, Nevada || 7–6 || 2–3 || –
|- bgcolor="#ccffcc"
| 6 || March 7 || vs  || Rebel Field • Paradise, Nevada || 7–6 || 3–3 || –
|- bgcolor="#ffcccc"
| 7 || March 8 || vs BYU || Rebel Field • Paradise, Nevada || 19–21 || 3–4 || –
|- bgcolor="#ccffcc"
| 8 || March 11 || at  || Vincent–Beck Stadium • Beaumont, Texas || 2–0 || 4–4 || –
|- bgcolor="#ccffcc"
| 9 || March 12 || vs  || Cougar Field • Houston, Texas || 23–8 || 5–4 || –
|- bgcolor="#ffcccc"
| 10 || March 13 || at  || Perry Field • Gainesville, Florida || 0–4 || 5–5 || –
|- bgcolor="#ccffcc"
| 11 || March 14 || at Houston || Cougar Field • Houston, Texas || 19–9 || 6–5 || –
|- bgcolor="#ccffcc"
| 12 || March 17 || Rice || Allie P. Reynolds Stadium • Stillwater, Oklahoma || 31–3 || 7–5 || –
|- bgcolor="#ccffcc"
| 13 || March 18 || Rice || Allie P. Reynolds Stadium • Stillwater, Oklahoma || 21–5 || 8–5 || –
|- bgcolor="#ffcccc"
| 14 || March 22 ||  || Allie P. Reynolds Stadium • Stillwater, Oklahoma || 4–7 || 8–6 || –
|- bgcolor="#ccffcc"
| 15 || March 23 || Florida || Allie P. Reynolds Stadium • Stillwater, Oklahoma || 16–7 || 9–6 || –
|- bgcolor="#ccffcc"
| 16 || March 24 || Florida || Allie P. Reynolds Stadium • Stillwater, Oklahoma || 14–4 || 10–6 || –
|- bgcolor="#ffcccc"
| 17 || March 26 || || Allie P. Reynolds Stadium • Stillwater, Oklahoma || 0–3 || 10–7 || –
|- bgcolor="#ccffcc"
| 18 || March 27 ||  || Allie P. Reynolds Stadium • Stillwater, Oklahoma || 13–2 || 11–7 || –
|- bgcolor="#ffcccc"
| 19 || March 28 ||  || Allie P. Reynolds Stadium • Stillwater, Oklahoma || 7–8 || 11–8 || 0–1
|- bgcolor="#ffcccc"
| 20 || March 29 || at Oklahoma || L. Dale Mitchell Baseball Park • Norman, Oklahoma || 2–8 || 11–9 || 0–2
|- bgcolor="#ffcccc"
| 21 || March 29 || vs Oklahoma || All Sports Stadium • Oklahoma City, Oklahoma || 2–3 || 11–10 || 0–3
|- bgcolor="#ccffcc"
| 22 || March 30 || at Oklahoma || L. Dale Mitchell Baseball Park • Norman, Oklahoma || 22–3 || 12–10 || 1–3
|-

|- bgcolor="#ccffcc"
| 23 || April 1 || at  || George Cole Field • Fayetteville, Arkansas || 11–9 || 13–10 || 1–3
|- bgcolor="#ccffcc"
| 24 || April 4 ||  || Allie P. Reynolds Stadium • Stillwater, Oklahoma || 4–2 || 14–10 || 2–3
|- bgcolor="#ccffcc"
| 25 || April 5 || Kansas State || Allie P. Reynolds Stadium • Stillwater, Oklahoma || 12–3 || 15–10 || 3–3
|- bgcolor="#ccffcc"
| 26 || April 5 || Kansas State || Allie P. Reynolds Stadium • Stillwater, Oklahoma || 19–6 || 16–10 || 4–3
|- bgcolor="#ccffcc"
| 27 || April 6 || Kansas State || Allie P. Reynolds Stadium • Stillwater, Oklahoma || 17–0 || 17–10 || 5–3
|- bgcolor="#ccffcc"
| 28 || April 8 ||  || Allie P. Reynolds Stadium • Stillwater, Oklahoma || 9–1 || 18–10 || 5–3
|- bgcolor="#ccffcc"
| 29 || April 8 || North Texas State || Allie P. Reynolds Stadium • Stillwater, Oklahoma || 8–2 || 19–10 || 5–3
|- bgcolor="#ccffcc"
| 30 || April 9 || North Texas State || Allie P. Reynolds Stadium • Stillwater, Oklahoma  || 13–2 || 20–10 || 5–3
|- bgcolor="#ccffcc"
| 31 || April 9 || North Texas State || Allie P. Reynolds Stadium • Stillwater, Oklahoma  || 11–3 || 21–10 || 5–3
|- bgcolor="#ccffcc"
| 32 || April 11 ||  || Allie P. Reynolds Stadium • Stillwater, Oklahoma || 18–5 || 22–10 || 5–3
|- bgcolor="#ccffcc"
| 33 || April 11 || Arkansas–Little Rock || Allie P. Reynolds Stadium • Stillwater, Oklahoma || 15–0 || 23–10 || 5–3
|- bgcolor="#ccffcc"
| 34 || April 12 || Arkansas–Little Rock || Allie P. Reynolds Stadium • Stillwater, Oklahoma || 11–3 || 24–10 || 5–3
|- bgcolor="#ccffcc"
| 35 || April 12 || Arkansas–Little Rock || Allie P. Reynolds Stadium • Stillwater, Oklahoma || 11–1 || 25–10 || 5–3
|- bgcolor="#ccffcc"
| 36 || April 13 ||  || Allie P. Reynolds Stadium • Stillwater, Oklahoma || 18–4 || 26–10 || 5–3
|- bgcolor="#ccffcc"
| 37 || April 15 || Arkansas || Allie P. Reynolds Stadium • Stillwater, Oklahoma || 8–7 || 27–10 || 5–3
|- bgcolor="#ccffcc"
| 38 || April 16 ||  || Allie P. Reynolds Stadium • Stillwater, Oklahoma || 8–3 || 28–10 || 5–3
|- bgcolor="#ccffcc"
| 39 || April 16 || Missouri Southern || Allie P. Reynolds Stadium • Stillwater, Oklahoma || 20–6 || 29–10 || 5–3
|- bgcolor="#ccffcc"
| 40 || April 18 || at  || Simmons Field • Columbia, Missouri || 17–3 || 30–10 || 6–3
|- bgcolor="#ccffcc"
| 41 || April 19 || at Missouri || Simmons Field • Columbia, Missouri || 4–0 || 31–10 || 7–3
|- bgcolor="#ccffcc"
| 42 || April 19 || at Missouri || Simmons Field • Columbia, Missouri || 4–0 || 32–10 || 8–3
|- bgcolor="#ccffcc"
| 43 || April 20 || at Missouri || Simmons Field • Columbia, Missouri || 12–1 || 33–10 || 9–3
|- bgcolor="#ccffcc"
| 44 || April 22 || UNLV || Allie P. Reynolds Stadium • Stillwater, Oklahoma || 8–5 || 34–10 || 9–3
|- bgcolor="#ccffcc"
| 45 || April 23 || UNLV || Allie P. Reynolds Stadium • Stillwater, Oklahoma || 13–6 || 35–10 || 9–3
|- bgcolor="#ccffcc"
| 46 || April 23 || UNLV || Allie P. Reynolds Stadium • Stillwater, Oklahoma || 5–1 || 36–10 || 9–3
|- bgcolor="#ccffcc"
| 47 || April 25 ||  || Allie P. Reynolds Stadium • Stillwater, Oklahoma || 12–2 || 37–10 || 10–3
|- bgcolor="#ccffcc"
| 48 || April 26 || Kansas || Allie P. Reynolds Stadium • Stillwater, Oklahoma || 10–7 || 38–10 || 11–3
|- bgcolor="#ccffcc"
| 49 || April 26 || Kansas || Allie P. Reynolds Stadium • Stillwater, Oklahoma || 16–3 || 39–10 || 12–3
|- bgcolor="#ccffcc"
| 50 || April 27 || Kansas || Allie P. Reynolds Stadium • Stillwater, Oklahoma || 13–8 || 40–10 || 13–3
|- bgcolor="#ccffcc"
| 51 || April 29 || at || Eck Stadium • Wichita, Kansas || 13–3 || 41–10 || 13–3
|-

|- bgcolor="#ffcccc"
| 52 || May 1 || at  || Buck Beltzer Stadium • Lincoln, Nebraska || 2–6 || 41–11 || 13–4
|- bgcolor="#ccffcc"
| 53 || May 1 || at Nebraska || Buck Beltzer Stadium • Lincoln, Nebraska || 10–6 || 42–11 || 14–4
|- bgcolor="#ffcccc"
| 54 || May 2 || at Nebraska || Buck Beltzer Stadium • Lincoln, Nebraska || 11–12 || 42–12 || 14–5
|- bgcolor="#ccffcc"
| 55 || May 2 || at Nebraska || Buck Beltzer Stadium • Lincoln, Nebraska || 16–8 || 43–12 || 15–5
|- bgcolor="#ccffcc"
| 56 || May 9 ||  || Allie P. Reynolds Stadium • Stillwater, Oklahoma || 10–5 || 44–12 || 16–5
|- bgcolor="#ccffcc"
| 57 || May 11 || Iowa State || Allie P. Reynolds Stadium • Stillwater, Oklahoma || 3–2 || 45–12 || 17–5
|- bgcolor="#ccffcc"
| 58 || May 11 || Iowa State || Allie P. Reynolds Stadium • Stillwater, Oklahoma || 13–5 || 46–12 || 18–5
|-

|-
|-
! style="" | Postseason
|- valign="top" 

|- bgcolor="#ccffcc"
| 59 || May 14 || vs Nebraska || All Sports Stadium • Oklahoma City, Oklahoma || 6–0 || 47–12 || 18–5
|- bgcolor="#ffcccc"
| 60 || May 16 || vs Oklahoma || All Sports Stadium • Oklahoma City, Oklahoma || 5–7 || 47–13 || 18–5
|- bgcolor="#ccffcc"
| 61 || May 17 || vs Missouri || All Sports Stadium • Oklahoma City, Oklahoma || 6–3 || 48–13 || 18–5
|- bgcolor="#ccffcc"
| 62 || May 17 || vs Oklahoma || All Sports Stadium • Oklahoma City, Oklahoma || 12–7 || 49–13 || 18–5
|- bgcolor="#ccffcc"
| 63 || May 18 || vs Oklahoma || All Sports Stadium • Oklahoma City, Oklahoma || 9–3 || 50–13 || 18–5
|-

|- bgcolor="#ccffcc"
| 64 || May 22 ||  || Allie P. Reynolds Stadium • Stillwater, Oklahoma || 20–8 || 51–13 || 18–5
|- bgcolor="#ccffcc"
| 65 || May 23 ||  || Allie P. Reynolds Stadium • Stillwater, Oklahoma || 23–2 || 52–13 || 18–5
|- bgcolor="#ccffcc"
| 66 || May 24 ||  || Allie P. Reynolds Stadium • Stillwater, Oklahoma || 16–8 || 53–13 || 18–5
|- bgcolor="#ccffcc"
| 67 || May 25 || Stanford || Allie P. Reynolds Stadium • Stillwater, Oklahoma || 3–0 || 54–13 || 18–5
|-

|- bgcolor="#ffcccc"
| 68 || May 31 || vs Miami (FL) || Johnny Rosenblatt Stadium • Omaha, Nebraska || 2–6 || 54–14 || 18–5
|- bgcolor="#ccffcc"
| 69 || June 1 || vs  || Johnny Rosenblatt Stadium • Omaha, Nebraska || 4–0 || 55–14 || 18–5
|- bgcolor="#ccffcc"
| 70 || June 4 || vs  || Johnny Rosenblatt Stadium • Omaha, Nebraska || 11–5 || 56–14 || 18–5
|- bgcolor="#ffcccc"
| 71 || June 5 || vs Florida State || Johnny Rosenblatt Stadium • Omaha, Nebraska || 5–6 || 56–15 || 18–5
|-

Awards and honors 
Jimmy Barragan
All-Big Eight Conference
Third Team All-American American Baseball Coaches Association
Second Team All-American Baseball America

Jeff Bronkey
Big Eight Conference All-Tournament Team

Monty Fariss
Big Eight Conference All-Tournament Team

Bryn Kosco
Big Eight Conference All-Tournament Team

Jim Ifland
All-Big Eight Conference
Big Eight Conference All-Tournament Team

David Osteen
All-Big Eight Conference

Robin Ventura
All-Big Eight Conference
Big Eight Conference All-Tournament Team
Big Eight Conference Tournament MVP
First Team All-American Baseball America
College World Series All-Tournament Team

Rob Walton
Big Eight Conference All-Tournament Team

References

Oklahoma State Cowboys baseball seasons
Oklahoma State Cowboys baseball
College World Series seasons
Oklahoma State